Dont stress me stylized as (dont stress Me) is the second album by Swedish rapper Rebstar. It was released on September 29, 2017 by Today Is Vintage. The album contains elements of rap, R&B, funk and pop.

Track listing

Personnel 
 Executive produced by Rebstar, DJ Pain 1
 Photography: LE SINNER
 Artwork direction by Rebstar, pvtso
 Artwork design by pvtso
 Engineered by Rebstar, LE SINNER, Naked People, Baby Mike
 Mixed by Guy Joyner, DJ Pain 1, Rebstar, Vintage Madison, LE SINNER
 Mastered by Guy Joyner for Sine-Post Audio

References 

2017 albums
Rebstar albums